Canthon imitator is a species of beetle in the family Scarabaeidae.

References

Further reading

 

Deltochilini
Articles created by Qbugbot
Beetles described in 1946